Flying Nightmares is a flight simulator published by Domark for the Power Macintosh running classic Mac OS. It was a port of the almost identical IBM PC version, SVGA Harrier. It was one of the first commercial PPC native games. It was later ported to the 3DO by Lifelike Productions.

Released on Compact Disk, it was notable for having a 10 MB introduction video that was not based on actual in-game footage, while the game itself was only 3 MB and was based on SVGA graphics ported from the PC.

Gameplay
Flying Nightmares is a combat flight simulator in a Harrier jump jet. It is combined with a theatre-scale strategic layer.

Reception
Next Generation reviewed the 3DO version of the game, rating it three stars out of five, and stated that "this is as good as the 3DO is likely to see, but still not recommended for everyone."

Reviews
GamePro (Nov, 1995)
Electronic Gaming Monthly (Nov, 1995)
Power Unlimited - Mar, 1996
All Game Guide - 1998

References

External links
 Flying Nightmares at GameFAQs
 Flying Nightmares at Giant Bomb
 Flying Nightmares at MobyGames

1994 video games
3DO Interactive Multiplayer games
Cancelled Sega CD games
Classic Mac OS games
Combat flight simulators
Domark games
Video games developed in the United States